Compressed Air and Gas Institute or CAGI is the industry association located in Cleveland, Ohio, USA. It was founded in 1915. CAGI represents manufacturers of compressed air system equipment, including air compressors, blowers, pneumatic tools, and air and gas drying and filtration equipment. It also develops standards for compressors, compressor-related testing, air dryers, filters and portable air tools, many prepared and updated in coordination with 
other standards organizations, including Pneurop and the American National Standards Institute.

References

External links 
 cagi.org

Organizations established in 1915
Trade associations based in the United States
Organizations based in Cleveland
Industrial gases
1915 establishments in Ohio